Polesie Voivodeship was an administrative unit of interwar Poland (1918–1939), named after the historical region of Polesia. It was created by the Council of Ministers of the Second Polish Republic on February 19, 1921, as a result of peace agreement signed with the Russian and Ukrainian SSRs in Riga. Polesie Voivodeship was the largest province of interwar Poland. It ceased to function in September 1939, following the Nazi-German and Soviet invasion of Poland in accordance with a secret protocol of the Nazi–Soviet Pact of non-aggression.

Demographics 
The provincial capital of the Polesie Voivodeship, and also the largest city was Brześć nad Bugiem (Brest-on-the-Bug) with some 48,000 inhabitants (1931). The province was made up of 9 powiats (counties), and had 12 substantial towns or cities. In 1921, the population of the province numbered 879,417, with a population density of about 20.8 persons per km2, the lowest in interwar Poland. By 1931, thanks to a government-sponsored settlement programme and the progressive development of education, commerce and industry in the urban centres (neglected under Tsarist Russia), the population had risen to 1,132,200, and the population density to 31 per km2. The Jews constituted 49.2% of the urban population of Polesie, the highest in interwar Poland. They engaged mainly in retail trade, commerce and small industry.

According to the 1931 census, some 80.6% of the population engaged in agriculture. Most estates above 50 hectares in size, were owned by Poles (65.4%), followed by ethnic Belarusians (17.8%). The majority of inhabitants (62.6%) described themselves merely as “locals” (Tutejszy), and for the greater part were peasants of Belarusian and Ukrainian origin. Ethnic Poles made up around 15% of the population, Ukrainians (mainly in the south-east) numbered about 5%, Belarusians 6.6%, and Jews (mainly in towns) around 10%. Smaller communities of Russians also existed. The illiteracy rate was 48.4% due to the lingering imperial legacy, the highest in Poland and well above the national average of 23.1% (in 1931).

Location and area 
Initially, the area of the voivodeship comprised 42 149 km2. However, in 1930 Sarny county became part of the Volhynian Voivodeship, thus the area shrank to 36 668 km2. Even after this change, it still was the biggest Voivodeship of interwar Poland.

Polesie lay in eastern part of the then Polish state, bordering the Soviet Union to the east, Lublin Voivodeship and Białystok Voivodeship (1919–1939) to the west, Nowogródek Voivodeship to the north and the Volhynian Voivodeship to the south. Most of it consisted of the Polesie swamp - a flat, vast, sparsely inhabited area, with several rivers and streams. Access to some villages and hamlets required boats, especially in early spring, when the waters of the Pripyat and other rivers (like the Pina, the Styr and the Horyn) rose as the snow melted. In 1937 forests covered 33.3% of the Voivodeship (compared with the average for the whole country of 22.2%). The biggest lake in the voivodeship's area, Lake Wygonowskie, lay on the Oginski Canal. In the spring of 1939, construction of the 127-kilometer Stone Canal (Kanal Kamienny) began. The canal was planned to connect Pinsk with Klesow, which at that time was part of Volhynian Sarny County.

Cities and counties 
Brześć, the voivodeship's capital and biggest city, did not have an impressively large population: about 50,700 according to the 1931 national census and around 55,000 in mid-1939. Other urban centers included Pińsk (population 31,900 in 1931), Dawidgródek (population 11,500), Kobryń (population 10,100) and Prużana (population 6,500).

Counties of Polesie Voivodeship

The voivodeship was created on February 19, 1921 with its capital was Pińsk. However, after the citywide fire in August 1921, the voivodship's capital was moved to Brześć Litewski. Brześć Litewski was renamed as Brześć nad Bugiem ("Brest on the Bug" in Polish) on March 20, 1923. Between 1921 and 1923 the first administrative division of Polesie Voivodeship included: the Brześć county, the Drohiczyn Poleski county, the Kamień Koszyrski county, the Kossów county, the Łuniniec county, the Pińsk county, the Prużana county, and the Sarny county.

On January 1, 1923, Stolin county (powiat) was created from several gminas within the Łuniniec, Pińsk and Sarny counties. On December 16, 1930, Sarny County was transferred to Wołyń Voivodeship. On April 1, 1935, Kossów county's capital was moved to Iwacewicze and it was renamed as Iwacewicze county.

Infrastructure and industry 
However, the Russian rule during the Partitions of Poland (ending in 1918), left Polesie in the state of economic collapse. Roads and means of communication were destroyed, along with most of the industry. Agriculture was underdeveloped. There were few rail hubs: Brześć (with 5 routes), Łuniniec, Żabinka, and Sarny. By 1937 the total length of railroads within voivodeship grew to 1,063 km, while rail density was 2.9 km per 100 km2 (the lowest in the country). The number of people employed in trades was 38,400 in 12,800 enterprises. Improvements in the socio-economic situation of the ethnically Belarusian peasantry were very slow. Statistically, ethnic Poles constituted 14,5% of the general population in 1931; Polish Jews, about 10,1% (or 114,000) half of whom (at roughly 49%) lived in the cities. Most of provincial economy depended upon the Jewish tradesmen, many of whom immigrated to Poland to escape pogroms in the east. Ethnic Ukrainian population of Polesie was 19,3% of the voivodeship, at 219,000. Persisting needs of continuous state investment (as outlined in the 1936 memo) were massive; the road-building programme required 7.1 million Polish złoty annually, with the complete lack of stone in the area. The projected cost of reconstructing waterways was estimated at 14.4 million złoty; processing plants and points of sales at 2.5 million złoty, dairy industry at 480.000 złoty annually, including 2 million złoty for education. In the opinion of local administrators, the economy of interwar Poland consisted of two parts: Poland "A" (better developed) and Poland "B" (less developed); the Polesie area was named by them Poland "C".

1939 and its aftermath 

The Soviet Union invaded eastern Poland on September 17, 1939, two and a half weeks after the Nazi German invasion of Poland of September 1. A two-pronged attack was decided in the secret Molotov-Ribbentrop Pact signed by the USSR with Germany in August 1939. As the bulk of the Polish Army had concentrated in the west of the country to fight the Germans, the Soviets met with limited resistance and their troops quickly moved westwards until they reached Brześć on September 22, where they met with the invading German army, and held the joint victory parade.

The Soviet authorities who occupied the Polesie Voivodeship dismantled the Polish administration and formally annexed what became known as West Belarus into the Soviet Union, dividing it between the Ukrainian Soviet Socialist Republic and the Byelorussian Soviet Socialist Republic (Polesia Voblast). Following the Tehran Conference of 1943, Joseph Stalin insisted in 1945 on redrawing Poland's borders with Western approval. The Soviets forcibly resettled the Polish population of the province to the west, and the prewar voivodeship area became part of the Soviet Union for the next sixty years.  most of the former Polesie Voivodeship (including Brześć and Pińsk) belongs to the sovereign Belarus; only the southern part of it belongs to Ukraine (Kamień Koszyrski and Sarny). Nearly all of the Belarusian part of Polesie Voivodeship is part of Brest Voblast, except Sosnkowicze (now Lenin) gmina of Łuniniec powiat with villages of Cimoszewicze ve Milewicze, it was part of Pinsk Oblast between 1939 and 1941 and 1944 and 1954 and Brest Voblast between 1954 and 1960 as a raion (Its centre was moved to Mikashevichy on 8 June) before transferring to Žytkavičy Rajon of Homiel Voblast due to dissolving Lenin one on 20 January 1960.

Voivodes 
 Walery Roman 14 March 1921 – 3 May 1922
 Stanisław Józef Downarowicz 18 May 1922 – 2 October 1924
 Kazimierz Młodzianowski 4 October 1924 – 5 May 1926
 Vacant 5 May 1926 – 14 July 1926
 Jan Krahelski 14 July 1926 – 8 September 1932 (acting to 23 December 1926)
 Wacław Kostek-Biernacki 8 September 1932 – 2 September 1939
 Jerzy Albin de Tramecourt 17 February 1937 – 7 September 1937 (acting for Kostek-Biernacki)

Literature 
 Svetlana Boltovskaja u. a.; Eva Gerhards (Hrsg.): Tschernobyl: Expeditionen in ein verlorenes Land. Städtische Museen Freiburg im Breisgau, Imhof, Petersberg, 2011, 
 Diana Siebert: Die ländliche Wirtschaft im polnischen und sowjetischen Teil des weissrussischen Polesien (1921–1939) – Ein Vergleich, Hausarbeit zur Magisterprüfung an der Philosophischen Fakultät der Universität zu Köln. Köln 1990.
 Diana Siebert: Herrschaftstechniken im Sumpf und ihre Reichweiten. Landschaftsinterventionen und Social Engineering in Polesien von 1914 bis 1941. Harrassowitz Verlag, Wiesbaden, 2019. .

See also
 Brest Litovsk Voivodeship

Notes

References 
 Mały rocznik statystyczny 1939, Warszawa, Nakładem Głównego Urzędu Statystycznego Rzeczpospolitej Polskiej (Concise Statistical Year-Book of Poland, Warsaw 1939)

 
Poleskie
Western Belorussia (1918–1939)
Former subdivisions of Belarus